The meridian 76° west of Greenwich is a line of longitude that extends from the North Pole across the Arctic Ocean, North America, the Atlantic Ocean, the Caribbean Sea, South America, the Pacific Ocean, the Southern Ocean, and Antarctica to the South Pole.

The 76th meridian west forms a great circle with the 104th meridian east.

From Pole to Pole
Starting at the North Pole and heading south to the South Pole, the 76th meridian west passes through:

{| class="wikitable plainrowheaders"
! scope="col" width="120" | Co-ordinates
! scope="col" | Country, territory or sea
! scope="col" | Notes
|-
| style="background:#b0e0e6;" | 
! scope="row" style="background:#b0e0e6;" | Arctic Ocean
| style="background:#b0e0e6;" |
|-
| 
! scope="row" | 
| Nunavut — Ellesmere Island
|-valign="top"
| style="background:#b0e0e6;" | 
! scope="row" style="background:#b0e0e6;" | Baffin Bay
| style="background:#b0e0e6;" | Passing just east of Bylot Island, Nunavut,  (at )
|-
| 
! scope="row" | 
| Nunavut — Baffin Island
|-
| style="background:#b0e0e6;" | 
! scope="row" style="background:#b0e0e6;" | Foxe Basin
| style="background:#b0e0e6;" |
|-
| 
! scope="row" | 
| Nunavut — Baird Peninsula, Baffin Island
|-
| style="background:#b0e0e6;" | 
! scope="row" style="background:#b0e0e6;" | Foxe Basin
| style="background:#b0e0e6;" |
|-
| 
! scope="row" | 
| Nunavut — Prince Charles Island
|-
| style="background:#b0e0e6;" | 
! scope="row" style="background:#b0e0e6;" | Foxe Basin
| style="background:#b0e0e6;" |
|-
| 
! scope="row" | 
| Nunavut — Foxe Peninsula, Baffin Island
|-
| style="background:#b0e0e6;" | 
! scope="row" style="background:#b0e0e6;" | Hudson Strait
| style="background:#b0e0e6;" |
|-valign="top"
| 
! scope="row" | 
|-valign="top"
| 
! scope="row" | 
| New York Pennsylvania — from  Maryland — from 
|-
| style="background:#b0e0e6;" | 
! scope="row" style="background:#b0e0e6;" | Chesapeake Bay
| style="background:#b0e0e6;" |
|-
| 
! scope="row" | 
| Maryland — Smith Island
|-
| style="background:#b0e0e6;" | 
! scope="row" style="background:#b0e0e6;" | Chesapeake Bay
| style="background:#b0e0e6;" |
|-
| 
! scope="row" | 
| Virginia — Tangier Island
|-
| style="background:#b0e0e6;" | 
! scope="row" style="background:#b0e0e6;" | Chesapeake Bay
| style="background:#b0e0e6;" |
|-
| 
! scope="row" | 
| Virginia — tip of the Delmarva Peninsula
|-
| style="background:#b0e0e6;" | 
! scope="row" style="background:#b0e0e6;" | Chesapeake Bay
| style="background:#b0e0e6;" |
|-valign="top"
| 
! scope="row" | 
| Virginia North Carolina — from 
|-
| style="background:#b0e0e6;" | 
! scope="row" style="background:#b0e0e6;" | Albemarle Sound
| style="background:#b0e0e6;" |
|-
| 
! scope="row" | 
| North Carolina — Engelhard
|-
| style="background:#b0e0e6;" | 
! scope="row" style="background:#b0e0e6;" | Pamlico Sound
| style="background:#b0e0e6;" |
|-
| 
! scope="row" | 
| North Carolina — Ocracoke Island
|-valign="top"
| style="background:#b0e0e6;" | 
! scope="row" style="background:#b0e0e6;" | Atlantic Ocean
| style="background:#b0e0e6;" | Passing just east of the island of Eleuthera,  (at ) Passing just west of Little San Salvador Island,  at 
|-
| 
! scope="row" | 
| Great Exuma Island
|-valign="top"
| style="background:#b0e0e6;" | 
! scope="row" style="background:#b0e0e6;" | Atlantic Ocean
| style="background:#b0e0e6;" | Passing just west of the Jumentos Cays,  at 
|-
| 
! scope="row" | 
|
|-valign="top"
| style="background:#b0e0e6;" | 
! scope="row" style="background:#b0e0e6;" | Caribbean Sea
|-
| 
! scope="row" | 
|
|-
| 
! scope="row" | 
|
|-
| 
! scope="row" | 
|
|-
| style="background:#b0e0e6;" | 
! scope="row" style="background:#b0e0e6;" | Pacific Ocean
| style="background:#b0e0e6;" |
|-
| style="background:#b0e0e6;" | 
! scope="row" style="background:#b0e0e6;" | Southern Ocean
| style="background:#b0e0e6;" |
|-valign="top"
| 
! scope="row" | Antarctica
|-
| style="background:#b0e0e6;" | 
! scope="row" style="background:#b0e0e6;" | Southern Ocean
| style="background:#b0e0e6;" |
|-valign="top"
| 
! scope="row" | Antarctica
|-
|}

See also
75th meridian west
77th meridian west

w076 meridian west